Causata is an enterprise software company based in San Mateo, California, United States with development offices in London, England, UK. It provides software which is used by business-to-consumer marketers to manage interactions with customers. The company launched the fourth version of its products in February, 2013.

Corporate history 
Causata was founded in 2009 by Paul Phillips and opened its first office in London, England, UK. The company opened its San Mateo, California office in 2011. CEO Paul Wahl, a former CEO of SAP America and former COO of Siebel Systems, joined the company in March 2012.  Causata has received $23 million in venture funding from Accel Partners London, the Series C round coming in Feb. 2013.

In 2013, Causata was acquired by NICE Systems.

Products 
Causata's software uses HBase, the NoSQL database on the Hadoop Distributed File System. It has industry-specific applications for cross-sell, acquisition, and retention to enable marketers to personalize web and mobile interfaces, operate email and mobile messaging campaigns, enable targeted advertising and create context-driven sales and service.

The Identity Graph algorithms use first-party online and offline customer data to combine customers' identities and event timelines.
The Predictive Profile compares individual customer paths and histories against each other to predict customer intent. Machine learning algorithms based on reinforcement methodologies build real-time predictive analytics models for individual customers.
Decisioning serves targeted offers, promotions and ads to potential customers, based on information gathered by the previously mentioned analysis.

References 

Software companies based in California
Software companies established in 2009
Defunct software companies of the United States